Moaid Aziz Allami (born in Amarah) is an Iraqi journalist and president of the Federation of Journalists of Iraq. He holds a BA degree from Baghdad University. He was elected as a journalist in two consecutive sessions. He was elected a member of the Executive Committee of the International Federation of Journalists Spain, 2010, is currently President of the General Federation of Arab Journalists.

See also

 Federation of Journalists of Iraq
 International Federation of Journalists

References

External links
Official Website of Moaid Allami
 Official Website of Federation of Journalists of Iraq

Living people
People from Amarah
Iraqi journalists
Iraqi Shia Muslims
University of Baghdad alumni
Year of birth missing (living people)